Al-Samakiyya was a Palestinian Arab village in the Tiberias Subdistrict. It was depopulated during the 1947–1948 Civil War in Mandatory Palestine on May 4, 1948, under Operation Matateh. It was located 11 km northeast of Tiberias, near the Wadi al-Wadabani. The village was located at Tel Hum, which has been identified with Capernaum.

History
In 1838, Edward Robinson noted  the bedawin tribe of es-Semekiyeh, who kept some buildings in Abu Shusha as magazines.

British Mandate

In the 1922 census of Palestine conducted  by the British Mandate authorities, the population of  Samakiyeh was 193 Muslims, increasing in the  1931 census to 290; 266 Muslims and 24 Christians, in a total of 60 houses.

In the   1945 statistics Es Samakiya had a population of 380; 330 Muslims and 50 Christians, with 10,526 dunams of land. Of this, 2 dunams were used for citrus and bananas, 66 for plantations and irrigable land, 4,034  dunams for cereals, while a total of 6,424 dunams were classified as non-cultivable area. 

Al-Samakiyya had an Italian monastery, a Franciscan church, and a Greek Orthodox church.

1948, aftermath
On May 5, 1948, Allon launched Operation Broom, Operation Matateh, in order to clear the area of its Bedouin inhabitants.

Amnun and  Korazim were both established on Al-Samakiyya land in 1983.

In 1992 the village site was described: "The village site is covered with wild vegetation, piles of basalt stones, and date palm trees. Part of the surrounding land is used as pasture, and the other part is planted with fruit and walnut trees."

References

Bibliography

External links
Welcome To al-Samakiyya
  al-Samakiyya, Zochrot
Survey of Western Palestine, Map 6: IAA, Wikimedia commons
 Al-Samakiyya from the Khalil Sakakini Cultural Center
Al-Samakiyyeh (Talhum) from Dr. Moslih Kanaaneh

  

Arab villages depopulated during the 1948 Arab–Israeli War
District of Tiberias